Nils Lundkvist (born 27 July 2000) is a Swedish professional ice hockey defenceman for the  Dallas Stars of the National Hockey League (NHL). Lundkvist was selected in the first round, 28th overall, of the 2018 NHL Entry Draft by the New York Rangers. 

After two impressive seasons in the Swedish Hockey League (SHL) with Luleå HF, Lundkvist made his NHL debut in 2021 with the Rangers, prior to the following season was traded to the Dallas Stars.

Playing career
Lundkvist played as a youth within the Luleå HF organization of the Swedish Hockey League. He made his professional debut as a 17-year-old in the 2017–18 season.

Lundkvist recorded a break out year in the 2019–20 season with Luleå HF, recording 11 goals and 20 assists for 31 points through 45 games in finishing with the most assists and points as junior in the league.

In his fourth season in the SHL in 2020–21, Lundkvist having evolved into a top pairing blueliner, recorded 14 goals and 18 assists for 32 points in 52 games for the team. He led all defencemen in goals and power-play goals and his 14 goals were the most goals recorded by a defenceman under 21 in SHL history. Following a postseason exit after seven playoff games, he was awarded the Salming Trophy as the league's best defenceman.

On 3 June 2021, Lundkvist was signed by draft club, the New York Rangers, to a three-year, entry-level contract. On 11 October, the Rangers awarded Lundkvist with the Lars-Erik Sjöberg Award, which is given to best rookie in training camp. Remaining on the Rangers roster to open the  season, Lundkvist later scored his first NHL goal on 8 December 2021, at Madison Square Garden against the Colorado Avalanche.

On 19 September 2022, Lundkvist was traded to the Dallas Stars in exchange for a conditional 2023 first-round pick and a conditional 2025 fourth-round pick.

Career statistics

Regular season and playoffs

International

Awards and honors

References

External links
 

2000 births
Living people
Dallas Stars players
Hartford Wolf Pack players
Luleå HF players
National Hockey League first-round draft picks
New York Rangers draft picks
New York Rangers players
People from Piteå
Swedish ice hockey defencemen
Sportspeople from Norrbotten County